GSK4336A is a drug which acts as a selective androgen receptor modulator (SARM), and was developed for androgen replacement therapy.

See also 
 AC-262536
 ACP-105
 Enobosarm
 JNJ-28330835
 Ligandrol

References 

Selective androgen receptor modulators
Chloroarenes
Trifluoromethyl compounds
Amides
Benzoxazepines